Solomon Belaye (born 17 July 1947) is an Ethiopian sprinter. He competed in the men's 200 metres at the 1972 Summer Olympics.

References

1947 births
Living people
Athletes (track and field) at the 1972 Summer Olympics
Ethiopian male sprinters
Olympic athletes of Ethiopia
Place of birth missing (living people)